Skvorsovsky is a rural locality (a khutor) in Dvoynovskoye Rural Settlement, Novonikolayevsky District, Volgograd Oblast, Russia. The population was 62 as of 2010. There are 3 streets.

Geography 
Skvorsovsky is located in steppe, on the Khopyorsko-Buzulukskaya Plain, 19 km northeast of Novonikolayevsky (the district's administrative centre) by road. Dvoynovsky is the nearest rural locality.

References 

Rural localities in Novonikolayevsky District